Steel Lasso is an inverted coaster at Frontier City theme park. It opened in 2008 for the park's 50th anniversary celebration. The ride was designed by Vekoma and was made in the United States by Chance-Morgan Rides. It has a double figure eight layout with a clockwise downward helix near the end. Steel Lasso is stopped by a brake run that is built into the station. Steel Lasso is the first and only suspended roller coaster in the state of Oklahoma. The train features simple lap bars that lower from above the riders' heads. Steel Lasso currently has an orange and green paint scheme. The ride is a Suspended Family Coaster.

References

Roller coasters introduced in 2008
Inverted roller coasters
Roller coasters in Oklahoma
Frontier City